Adam Michael Cwejman (born 12 January 1985 in Gothenburg) is a Swedish politician of Polish-Jewish descent.

Cwejman joined the Liberal Youth of Sweden in 2006 and became a member of the executive committee in 2008. He has also worked as an ombudsman for the organization in western Sweden. He has a B.A. in international relations from the University of Gothenburg and has also worked at Volvo, as a gardener and as a teacher of Eastern European studies. He was unanimously elected chairman of the Liberal Youth of Sweden at its congress in Nässjö on 7 August 2009. He did not contest the 2012 chairman election, which was won by Linda Nordlund.

References

External links 
 Official blog

1985 births
Jewish Swedish politicians
Living people
Politicians from Gothenburg
Swedish Jews
University of Gothenburg alumni
Liberals (Sweden) politicians
Swedish bloggers